Captain Hector Barbossa is a fictional character of the Pirates of the Caribbean franchise, appearing in all five films in the series. Starting out as a villainous undead pirate in The Curse of the Black Pearl (2003), the character dies at the end of the film. However, he is revealed to have been brought back to life at the end of Dead Man's Chest before appearing in anti-heroic roles as a Pirate Lord in At World's End (2007), a privateer with the Royal Navy in On Stranger Tides (2011), and finally as the rich and influential leader of his own pirate fleet in Dead Men Tell No Tales (2017). Throughout the series, the character has been conceptualized as a "dark trickster" and the evil counterpart of Captain Jack Sparrow.

Background and development
Originally, Rush was second choice for the role behind Robert De Niro, who turned it down as he expected the film to flop like previous pirate films did. While in the first film, Barbossa was conceptualized as a villain, as a "dark trickster" and evil counterpart to Jack Sparrow, Rush felt that he was playing the unsung hero of the film, who only dreamed about lifting the curse and living as a rich rogue with his prized pirate bride. Johnny Depp proposed the character's first name "Hector" on set of the first film, although it is never mentioned in the film. As it appeared only on the DVD commentary, writers Ted Elliott and Terry Rossio originally thought it was fan-made when they saw it on the Internet, and decided to use it nonetheless. Actor Geoffrey Rush has expressed fondness with the potential and development of his character, who evolved throughout the series and ventured into different terrains every film, which kept him challenged as an actor: while he was only a classical evil villain in the first film, he turned into a pirate politician, hosting a "G 20 summit of pirate lords", and in the fourth film has turned legitimate and works for the king. As for the fifth installment, Rush has referred to Barbossa as a "corporate pirate" who has amassed immense influence and wealth for his fleet and brags of his showcased riches, although it is revealed in the fifth film that part of the reason Barbossa turned to piracy was the difficult feelings he had to live with after giving up his daughter for adoption. Also, he commented on the selfless sacrifice Barbossa makes to save his daughter, referring to it as a nice and final conclusion to the character's journey of redemption. Due to this, Rush stated that he cannot see himself portraying the character in a potential sequel again, with the exception of a short cameo as a ghost "annoying Jack Sparrow with his wisdom." Barbossa's name is based on Ottoman admiral, Hayreddin Barbarossa.

Fictional character biography
Information concerning Barbossa's childhood and youth stem from actor Geoffrey Rush, who devised a backstory for the character in order to portray him more convincingly. According to Rush, Barbossa was born to an impoverished Portuguese noblewoman by an unknown father and hailed from Lisbon in Portugal, a fact that is also deduced by Jack Sparrow based upon his accent in The Price of Freedom. Longing to escape a life of poverty, he ran away from home aged 13 to pursue life as a sailor. At first, Barbossa wanted to be an honest sailor with the merchant marine, but seeing the grandeur of the captains' cabins on the ships on which he served, he realized that a man from his station could never afford a lifestyle like that whilst remaining an honest sailor, choosing a life of piracy instead.

Nothing is known about his early exploits as a pirate prior to The Price of Freedom. In the novel, Barbossa, in his early 40s, is the captain of the pirate schooner Cobra. After plundering a French ivory barque, his ship is attacked and sunk by a crew of rogue pirates, and he is narrowly saved from drowning by his crew members Pintel and Ragetti. After managing to reach Tortuga, the then-Pirate Lord of the Caribbean brings them to Shipwreck Cove to report the incident to an assembly of pirates. A few months later, Jack Sparrow finds out that the attacker is Barbossa's old friend Boris Palachnik, the Pirate Lord of the Caspian Sea. The attackers are brought before a pirate court that summons Davy Jones, who confirms Palachnik's guilt. Visiting Palachink in prison, Barbossa is unknowingly granted the title of Pirate Lord of the Caspian Sea, as Palachink gives him his Piece of Eight and his ship. However, before Barbossa can claim his new vessel, the rogue pirates break out of prison and escape on his ship. After that, he is intent to join Captain Teague's hunting party and has his Piece of Eight carved into a wooden eye for his crew mate Ragetti.

Shortly after Jack Sparrow attains the Black Pearl, Barbossa joins him as his first mate. In the book series Legends of the Brethren Court, Tia Dalma tasks them with securing seven vials of shadow gold to stop the evil Shadow Lord from gaining total control over the seas by destroying the Brethren Court with his Shadow Army. Over the course of the novels, they are able to collect all vials shattered across the world by allying with or fighting against the other Pirate Lords. They are able to defeat the Shadow Lord with the combined efforts of all Pirate Lords, after which Jack wants to sail for Tortuga to recruit a new crew. Barbossa offers him to handle that in his stead, implying that he recruited men with the intent to mutineer against his captain.

Ten years before the events of The Curse of the Black Pearl, Barbossa led a mutiny against Jack Sparrow and marooned him on an uncharted island. Arriving at the treasure of Isla de Muerta, 882 identical pieces of Aztec gold, they claim it and spend it all. They realize too late that the cursed gold has turned them into undead. Shortly after the mutiny, Barbossa has Bootstrap Bill Turner killed by attaching a cannon to his foot and throwing him overboard. The crew spend the next years retrieving the Aztec gold and amassing treasure, unable to find the last piece of gold, as Bootstrap Bill had sent it to his son.

When Elizabeth Swann falls into the sea wearing Will's medallion, it alerts the cursed pirates to its location. Barbossa has Port Royal attacked and Elizabeth captured, who poses as "Elizabeth Turner". Mistaking her for Bootstrap Bill's child, he takes her to the Isla de Muerta to use her blood in a ritual to break the curse, which fails. Will reveals himself as Bootstrap's son and offers Barbossa his blood in exchange for Elizabeth's safety. Barbossa has Elizabeth and Jack marooned on exactly the same uncharted island where he marooned Jack years earlier. Before Barbossa can perform the ritual, Jack Sparrow arrives to the island on board a Royal Navy ship and confronts Barbossa. A fight ensues between Barbossa and Jack. As Will breaks the curse, Barbossa is shot to death by his old captain.

However, it is revealed in the closing scene of Dead Man's Chest that Barbossa was revived by Tia Dalma, who is actually the sea goddess Calypso in human form. In return, he struck a bargain with her to free her from her human body with the help of the Brethren Court. In order to do so, it is necessary that Jack Sparrow is rescued from Davy Jones' Locker. Their negotiations with Pirate Lord Sao Feng, who possesses a map to the Locker, are interrupted by an ambush by the East India Trading Company. Sao Feng agrees to provide them with the map and a crew.

After successfully freeing Jack, they are again attacked by the East India Trading Company, as Sao Feng had betrayed them. Nevertheless, they reach Shipwreck Cove, where Barbossa leads a meeting of the nine Pirate Lords. He proposes to free Calypso, which leads to a fight between the parties. When Elizabeth Swann is elected Pirate King, she decides to make a final stand against the trading company. After negotiations fail, Barbossa frees Calypso with the Pieces of Eight and the wrathful sea goddess creates a maelstrom, in which Barbossa captains the Black Pearl in a duel with the Flying Dutchman. During the fight, he officiates the marriage of Will Turner and Elizabeth Swann.

Some time later, he steals the Black Pearl from Jack once again and sails away, planning to use Sao Feng's map to find the Fountain of Youth. However, Jack has stolen the map from him in anticipation. Sometime after these events he fathers Carina Smyth and leaves her in an orphanage after her mother's death.

In On Stranger Tides, set over a decade and seven years after the third film, it is revealed that Barbossa had lost the Black Pearl to Edward "Blackbeard" Teach, who attacked the ship without warning and used his magical sword to turn the ship against his crew. Barbossa lost his right leg in the attack, and vowed to avenge the Pearl by killing Blackbeard. He joined the Royal Navy as a privateer to attain a new ship and safety from prosecution. He excelled so much at his new station that King George II personally tasked him with finding the Fountain of Youth. Barbossa forces Joshamee Gibbs, now in possession of the map, into assisting him on his quest. When they arrive at White Cap Bay, their ship is sunk by mermaids. Making their way through the jungle, Barbossa reaches the ship of Ponce de Leon in search for the two chalices required for the ritual, where he meets Jack Sparrow. The two decide to team up to retrieve the missing chalices from the Spanish camp, where they get captured, and later escape with the chalices. Reaching the Fountain, Barbossa engages Blackbeard in a duel, eventually mortally wounding him with his poisoned blade. He claims Blackbeard's ship, crew, and sword as payment for his lost leg and returns to a life of piracy.

One year later, during Dead Men Tell No Tales, Barbossa has achieved great success as a pirate and rules the Caribbean with his 10 ship fleet, even having acquired a golden peg leg. After three of his ships are sunk by the undead pirate hunter Captain Armando Salazar, whom Jack Sparrow had unintentionally unleashed, Barbossa confronts Salazar and offers to lead him to Jack Sparrow. Jack escapes to an island; the ghosts cannot step on land. An enraged Salazar starts slaughtering Barbossa's crew until Barbossa persuades Salazar to send him to fetch Sparrow. He double-crosses Salazar and allies with Sparrow, freeing the Black Pearl with Blackbeard's sword and once again captaining it. Upon seeing Carina's diary, he realizes she is his daughter. However, he chooses not to tell her of her true parentage in order to allow her to keep her idealized picture of her father, whom she imagines to be an astronomer. When they reach the island where the Trident of Poseidon is located, a fight between them and Salazar ensues, which later continues on the bottom of the ocean. Barbossa has himself lowered down with the ship's anchor to rescue Jack, Henry, and Carina. When Carina falls, Barbossa catches her, revealing a tattoo of the star constellation Carina, after which Carina realizes he is her father. Barbossa sacrifices his life to protect Carina from an approaching Salazar. Following these events, Carina takes up the last name Barbossa.

Other appearances
 In 2006, an animatronic Hector Barbossa was added (along with Captain Jack Sparrow) to the original Pirates of the Caribbean theme park ride at various Disney parks, wherein he appears as captain of the Wicked Wench.
 Hector Barbossa is one of only five Disney villains ever nominated for the MTV Movie Award for Best Villain, the others being Davy Jones, another villain in the Pirates of the Caribbean series, Scar from The Lion King, Jadis the White Witch in The Chronicles of Narnia: The Lion, the Witch and the Wardrobe and Lots-O'-Huggin' Bear from Toy Story 3.
 Hector Barbossa (along with another Black Pearl crewman) is pictured on the cover of issue No. 71 Piraten of WAS IST WAS, a German Knowledge-book series, aimed at children and adolescents.
 Barbossa was made into several action figures by NECA. He appeared in the first wave of Curse of the Black Pearl figures in his human form; that same figure was re-released as part of the fourth wave of Dead Man's Chest toys. Barbossa's cursed form was released as a box set, which also featured Jack Sparrow as a zombie, and the chest of cursed Aztec gold. Then, he was also released in the At World's End figure line. However, he did not come with Jack the Monkey, who was released in a figure set along with Marty. Lastly, Barbossa was featured in "On Stranger Tides" action figure wave with his peg leg and privateer suit. Barbossa was made as a plush toy for the M&M Dead Man's Chest.
Barbaros Hector Barbossa is Hayreddin Barbarossa

Video games 
 Barbossa was featured in almost all video games related to the series, namely Pirates of the Caribbean: The Curse of the Black Pearl (2003), Pirates of the Caribbean (2003), Pirates of the Caribbean: The Legend of Jack Sparrow (2006), Pirates of the Caribbean: At World's End (2007), Pirates of the Caribbean Online (2007), and Lego Pirates of the Caribbean: The Video Game (2011), in varying roles.
 In the Kingdom Hearts video game serie, Barbossa appears as a villain in the Pirates of the Caribbean setting, Port Royal, of Kingdom Hearts II. In the game, his role is copied and pasted from the film, with the exceptions of the presence of Sora, Donald and Goofy, his alliance with Pete and Maleficent, and his control over the Heartless. Due to the filming of the two sequels back-to-back, which resulted in Geoffrey Rush being unavailable, Hector Barbossa was voiced by Brian George in the English version and by Haruhiko Jō in the Japanese version. He has returned in Kingdom Hearts III, reprising his role from the third film and once again voiced by Brian George.
 Barbossa was one of the original playable characters available in the video game Disney Infinity released in August 2013.
 Captain Barbossa appears as a playble character in the world builder video game Disney Magic Kingdoms.
 He appears also in Sea of Thieves thanks to the extension A Pirate's Life (22 June 2021) which is a crossover with Pirates of the Caribbean universe

References

External links
 Hector Barbossa on IMDb
Hector Barbossa at the Pirates of the Caribbean Wiki

Film characters introduced in 2003
Fictional amputees
Fictional English people
Fictional first officers
Fictional helmsmen
Fictional nobility
Fictional privateers
Fictional Royal Navy personnel
Fictional sea captains
Fictional sea pirates
Fictional skeletons
Fictional swordfighters in films
Fictional gunfighters in films
Fictional musketeers and pistoleers
Fictional undead
Male characters in film
Pirates of the Caribbean characters
Video game bosses
Action film villains
Male film villains